Submission is the acknowledgement of the legitimacy of the power of one's superior or superiors.

Submission may also refer to:

Films
 Submission (1976 film), an Italian erotic drama film
 Submission (2004 film), a Dutch short film about Islam
 Submission (2010 film), a Swedish documentary film
 Submission (2017 film), an American drama film

Music
(Alphabetical by artist)
 "Submission", a song by Ash from the 2001 album Free All Angels
 "Submission", a song by Basement from the 2015 album Promise Everything
 "Submission", a song by Gorillaz (featuring Danny Brown and Kelela) from the 2017 album Humanz
 "Submission", a song by the Sex Pistols from the 1977 album Never Mind the Bollocks, Here's the Sex Pistols

Other media
Submission (novel), a 2015 novel by Michel Houellebecq (French title: Soumission)
 Submission (TV series), a 2016 American erotic mini-series

Computing and technology
Electronic submission, the concept of submitting manuscripts, papers, etc. through digital media
Submission servers, mail submission agents which accept email from users and inject it into the email system

Religion
Ibadah, an Islamic principle of submission to divine will
Islam, which means "submission"
 Submission/Submitter, a member of United Submitters International, an Islamic sect

Sports
 Submission (combat sports), a concept in martial arts and combat sports
 Submission hold, a type of hold that forces the receiver to submit
 Submission wrestling, a type of wrestling with the aim of obtaining submission using submission holds

Other uses
 Submission (Alton Towers), an amusement ride
Sexual submission, the practice of deferring to the will of another in a sexual context